Black Eagle is a 1948 American Western film directed by Robert Gordon and starring  William Bishop, Virginia Patton, Gordon Jones and James Bell. It is based on the 1909 short story, The Passing of Black Eagle by O. Henry.

Plot
A tramp steals a ride in a horsebox, and becomes involved in the fight of the horse's owner against a crooked stock dealer.

Cast
 William Bishop as Jason Bond
 Virginia Patton as Ginny Long
 Gordon Jones as Benji Laughton
 James Bell as Frank Hayden
 Trevor Bardette as Mike Long
 Will Wright as Sheriff Claney 
 Edmund MacDonald as Si
 Paul E. Burns as Hank Daniels (as Paul Burns)

See also
 List of American films of 1948

References

External links

1948 films
1948 Western (genre) films
Columbia Pictures films
American Western (genre) films
Films directed by Robert Gordon
American black-and-white films
1940s American films
1940s English-language films